Mushumbi Pools is a business centre in Mushumbi pools Mbire District, north of Guruve in Mashonaland Central province in Zimbabwe.

Mushumbi pools is 251 km away from the capital city of Zimbabwe Harare and going 111 km further is Kanyemba border post a small town which borders Zimbabwe, Zambia and Mozambique.

During the liberation struggle villagers from Chitsungo, Neshangwe, Nyambudzi and surrounding areas were kept in keep which is along Dande river.

Mushumbi pools was derived from a rock, which is believed to be sacred and lies along Manyame river. We could not get further details about the pools, but it is believed to be associated with spirit mediums that used to guide people during the liberation struggle and is a major tourist attraction in Mbire district.

Mbire Rural District Council is a small farming community but usually experience drought due to the fact that it lies in the natural region five.

Member of parliament for Mbire at present is Honourable Douglas Karoro who is also deputy Minister of Agriculture.

Karoro in his second term as Mp has managed to bring a remarkable development in the area than the previous member of parliament.

Populated places in Mashonaland Central Province